In Greek mythology, Leda (Ancient Greek: Λήδα ) was an Aetolian princess who became a Spartan queen. According to Ovid, she was famed for her beautiful black hair and snowy skin. Her myth gave rise to the popular motif in Renaissance and later art of Leda and the Swan.

Family 

Leda was the daughter of the Aetolian King Thestius hence she was also called Thestias. Her mother was either Leucippe, Deidameia, daughter of Perieres, Eurythemis, daughter of Cleoboea, or Laophonte, daughter of Pleuron. According to Alcman, Leda's parents were Glaucus and Laophonte while Eumelus attested that they are Sisyphus and Panteiduia or Paneidyia. 

She married king Tyndareus of Sparta and by him became the mother of Helen of Troy, Clytemnestra, Castor, and Pollux (also called "Polydeuces"). Leda also had three other daughters by Tyndareus: Timandra, Phoebe, and Philonoe.

Mythology 
Leda was admired by Zeus, who seduced her in the guise of a swan. As a swan, Zeus fell into her arms for protection from a pursuing eagle. Their consummation, on the same night as Leda lay with her husband Tyndareus, resulted in two eggs from which hatched Helen (later known as the beautiful "Helen of Troy"), Clytemnestra, and Castor and Pollux (also known as the Dioscuri). Which children are the progeny of Tyndareus the mortal king, and which are of Zeus and thus half-immortal, is not consistent among accounts, nor is which child hatched from which egg. The split is almost always half mortal, half divine, although the pairings do not always reflect the children's heritage pairings. Castor and Pollux are sometimes both mortal, sometimes both divine. One consistent point is that if only one of them is immortal, it is Pollux.  It is also always stated that Helen is the daughter of Zeus.

In Homer's Iliad, Helen looks down from the walls of Troy and wonders why she does not see her brothers among the Achaeans. The narrator remarks that they are both already dead and buried back in their homeland of Lacedaemon, thus suggesting that at least in the Homeric tradition, both were mortal.

Another account of the myth states that Nemesis (Νέμεσις) was the mother of Helen, and was also impregnated by Zeus in the guise of a swan. A shepherd found the egg and gave it to Leda, who carefully kept it in a chest until the egg hatched. When the egg hatched, Leda adopted Helen as her daughter. Zeus also commemorated the birth of Helen by creating the constellation Cygnus (Κύκνος), the Swan, in the sky.

In art 
Leda and the Swan, Leda and the Egg, and Leda with her children were popular subjects in ancient art. In the post-classical arts, it became a potent source of inspiration. It is the subject of William Butler Yeats' poem Leda and the Swan. She is also the main subject in Honoré Desmond Sharrer's "Leda & the Folks", a large painting focusing as well on the parents of entertainer Elvis Presley and currently located at the Smith College Museum of Art.

Australian artist Sidney Nolan produced at least a dozen interpretations of Leda and the Swan in the 1950s and 1960s, connected with his work on the myths of the Trojan War and World War I.

Recently, the myth inspired Hozier to write a song about the Dobbs v. Jackson decision, which repealed Roe v Wade. The song is called Swan Upon Leda.

Genealogy

Notes

References 
 Apollodorus, The Library with an English Translation by Sir James George Frazer, F.B.A., F.R.S. in 2 Volumes, Cambridge, MA, Harvard University Press; London, William Heinemann Ltd. 1921. ISBN 0-674-99135-4. Online version at the Perseus Digital Library. Greek text available from the same website.
Gaius Julius Hyginus, Fabulae from The Myths of Hyginus translated and edited by Mary Grant. University of Kansas Publications in Humanistic Studies. Online version at the Topos Text Project.

External links
 
 Warburg Institute Iconographic Database (ca 200 images of Leda)

Princesses in Greek mythology
Queens in Greek mythology
Family of Calyce
Mortal women of Zeus
Mythological rape victims
Aetolian characters in Greek mythology
Laconian mythology